Società Sportiva Dilettante Sapri Calcio, commonly known as Sapri, was an Italian association football club located in Sapri, Campania. It has played in Serie D in the last ten years. Its colors were all-blue.

History 
The club was founded in 1928.

The exclusion from football 
In April 2011, the club's assets were seized by authorities in a raid of suspected mafia assets.

In summer 2011 does not appeal against the exclusion of Covisod from Serie D and it was excluded from all football.

Honours 
Coppa Italia Serie D
Champions (1): 2008–09

References 

Football clubs in Campania
Association football clubs established in 1928
Association football clubs disestablished in 2011
Cilento
1928 establishments in Italy
2011 disestablishments in Italy